Michael Gravelle (born January 23, 1949) is a politician in Ontario, Canada. He was a Liberal member of the Legislative Assembly of Ontario who represented the riding of Thunder Bay—Superior North from 1995 to 2022 (known as Port Arthur from 1995 to 1999). He served as a member of cabinet during the Dalton McGuinty and Kathleen Wynne governments.

Background
Gravelle was born in Port Arthur, which is now a part of Thunder Bay, the son of Edmund Gravelle and Jan Shepherd.  He was educated at the Port Arthur Collegiate Institute and Lakehead University, receiving a degree from the latter institution 1968. He was an assistant to Liberal politicians Robert Andras, Stuart Smith and Joe Comuzzi.  He also worked as a publicist for the Canadian Broadcasting Corporation, and was a founder of the North of Superior Film Association.

Politics
Gravelle was elected to the Ontario legislature in the 1995 provincial election, defeating incumbent New Democrat Shelley Wark-Martyn by almost 7,000 votes in the riding of Port Arthur. The election was won by the Progressive Conservative Party of Ontario, and Gravelle joined 29 other Liberals in the opposition benches. He supported Dwight Duncan for the party leadership in 1996.

Gravelle was easily re-elected for the new riding of Thunder Bay—Superior North in the 1999 provincial election.

In the provincial election of 2003, Gravelle was re-elected with 72.5 per cent of the popular vote, the highest percentage total in the province.  He was appointed caucus chair on November 25, 2003. In the 2007 election, he was returned by a much narrower margin, 46.8 to 38.3, against New Democrat candidate Jim Foulds.

On October 30, 2007, Gravelle was named Ontario Minister of Northern Development and Mines. In the summer of 2009, Gravelle's ministry was expanded, adding on the responsibility of forestry. In 2011 he was shuffled to the position of Minister of Natural Resources. In February 2013, Kathleen Wynne moved him back to the position of Minister of Northern Development and Mines. He was reconfirmed in that role after the 2014 election.

He was re-elected in 2011, and 2014.

In February 2017, Gravelle temporarily stepped aside as minister because of his battle with depression; his duties were taken up by fellow cabinet minister Bill Mauro.

The Liberals were heavily defeated at the 2018 provincial election, and Gravelle was left as the only Liberal MPP in Northern Ontario.

In 2020, Gravelle announced that he would be seeking re-election, however, in April 2022 he announced that his previous cancer had returned, and later that month said that he was not able to run for re-election.

Cabinet positions

Electoral record

References

External links

1949 births
21st-century Canadian politicians
Franco-Ontarian people
Lakehead University alumni
Living people
Members of the Executive Council of Ontario
Ontario Liberal Party MPPs
Politicians from Thunder Bay